Miami Nights: Singles in the City is a dating simulation game for the J2ME Platform, Nintendo DS and BlackBerry. It is based on the successful Gameloft Nights franchise for mobile phones which has generated more than 4 million downloads.. The game is similar to New York Nights: Success in the City which is also a part of Gameloft's Nights series.

The American cover art depicts a woman wearing a dress, whereas the European/J2ME/BlackBerry cover art depicts the same woman in a bikini. There have been complaints about the game being slow after the language selection and taking a long time to load.

Other Miami Nights games include Miami Nights: Life in the Spotlight for DSiWare (released on December 14, 2009 in North America, and in 2010 internationally). and Miami Nights 2: The City is Yours, released on August 5, 2009 for BlackBerry.

Sequel
The game had a sequel for the DSi & BlackBerry. For the DSi sequel, it is called Miami Nights: Life in the Spotlight, while for the BlackBerry sequel, it is called Miami Nights 2: The City is Yours. Both have the same title cover, they just differ in title.

Reception

The DS version of Singles in the City and its DSi sequel received "generally unfavorable reviews" according to the review aggregation website Metacritic.

References

External links
 Miami Nights: Singles in the City page at developer Gameloft's website
 
 

BlackBerry games
Dating sims
Mobile games
Nintendo DS games
Video games scored by Jake Kaufman
Video games developed in Romania
2006 video games
Gameloft games
Java platform games
J2ME games
Multiplayer and single-player video games